Gary Dempsey may refer to:
 Gary Dempsey (Australian footballer) (born 1948), former Australian rules footballer
 Gary Dempsey (Irish footballer) (born 1981), Irish footballer for Bray Wanderers